Indira Spence (born 8 September 1986, in Trelawny) is a Jamaican athlete who specialises in the 100 metres hurdles. She represented her country at the 2011 World Championships reaching the semifinals, as well as the 2014 World Indoor Championships.

She has personal bests of 12.92 seconds in 100 metres hurdles (+1.3 m/s, Kingston 2012) and 8.05 seconds in the 60 metres hurdles (Fayetteville 2010).

Competition record

1Did not finish in the final

References

1986 births
Living people
Jamaican female hurdlers
Athletes (track and field) at the 2014 Commonwealth Games
People from Trelawny Parish
Competitors at the 2011 Summer Universiade
Commonwealth Games competitors for Jamaica